Crâng may refer to several villages in Romania:

 Crâng, a village in the town of Pătârlagele, Buzău County
 Crâng, a village in Ciocani Commune, Vaslui County